The Regional Ring Road is a proposed ring road around the city of Hyderabad, Telangana, India. It is a 6 lane,  road, planned on strengthening the existing road network and by adding new stretches wherever linkages were found missing. National Highways Authority of India has included Regional Ring road in the pan-India Bharatmala Pariyojana Phase-2. It helps connect the districts around city of Hyderabad. It helps in linking major national highways like NH 65, NH 44, NH 163, NH 765.

Major towns proposed to be connected by RRR

The major towns and villages are in Rangareddy, Bhuvanagiri, Siddipet  and Sangareddi districts.

The project will be developed in two portions:

Northern half  with a length of approx. 164 km is estimated to cost Rs. 9,500-crore and will connect Sangareddy, Narsapur, Toopran, Gajwel, Pragnapur, and Bhuvanagiri

Southern half with a length of approx. 182 km is estimated to cost Rs. 6,480-crore and will connect Bhuvanagiri, Choutuppal, Ibrahimpatnam, Kandukur, Amangal, Chevella, Shankarpally and Sangareddy.
 Bhuvanagiri Junction (Starting Point)
 Valigonda
 Sangem
 Choutuppal Junction
 samasthan narayanpur
 Shivannaguda
 marrigudem
 Mall-Kurmapally Junction
 Nagilla
 Amangal Junction
 Keshampet
 Shadnagar Junction
 Shabad
 Chevalla Junction
 Nawabpet
 Sangareddy Junction
 Doulthabad
 Narsapur Junction
 Shivampet
 Toopran Junction
 Nacharam
 Gajwel Junction
 Jagdevpur
 M.Turkapally (Ring Road ends at Bhuvanagiri)

Draft 
In the first draft proposal, it was proposed as Peripheral Ring Road (PRR) but the ring road has been renamed as RRR-triple R, covering 330 km.

See also 

Unified Metropolitan Transportation Authority, Hyderabad (India)
Outer Ring Road, Hyderabad
Inner Ring Road, Hyderabad
Radial Roads, Hyderabad (India)
Elevated Expressways in Hyderabad
Intermediate Ring Road, Hyderabad (India)

References

External links
 Move over RRR on its way

Roads in Hyderabad, India
Ring roads in India